The Berenstain Bears is a series of children's books created by Stan and Jan Berenstain.

Berenstain Bears may also refer to:
 The Berenstain Bears (1985 TV series), an Australian-American animated television series based on the book series
 The Berenstain Bears (2003 TV series), a Canadian animated television series based on the book series

See also
 List of Berenstain Bears books